Stramonita haemastoma, common name the red-mouthed rock shell or the Florida dog winkle, is a species of predatory sea snail, a marine gastropod mollusc in the family Muricidae, the rock snails.

Subspecies
Stramonita haemastoma contains the following subspecies:
Stramonita haemastoma canaliculata (Gray, 1839): synonym of Stramonita canaliculata (Gray, 1839)
Stramonita haemastoma floridana (Conrad, 1837): synonym of Stramonita floridana (Conrad, 1837) (unaccepted rank)
Stramonita haemastoma haemastoma (Linnaeus, 1767): synonym of Stramonita haemastoma (Linnaeus, 1767)

Distribution
The red-mouthed rock shell occurs widely in tropical and warm water areas of the Western Atlantic Ocean. Regions where it can be found include the Caribbean Sea, North Carolina and Florida, Bermuda and the entire Brazilian coast, including the islands of Abrolhos and Fernando de Noronha. It is also found in the Eastern Atlantic: tropical Western Africa and Southwestern Africa, including Cape Verde and Angola, and in European waters, including Macaronesian Islands, the Mediterranean Sea and the southwest coast of Apulia. Its once abundant population in the Eastern Mediterranean collapsed early in the 21st century and had entirely disappeared by 2016.

Description
The adult shell size for this species varies between 22 mm and 120 mm.

Feeding habits
Stramonita haemastoma is a widespread gastropod that consumes bivalves, barnacles and limpets. In the Mediterranean Sea the whelk is an important predator of the bivalve Mytilaster minimus, but where the invasive Lessepsian migrant bivalve Brachidontes pharaonis is found, the whelk prefers to prey on that species over the native bivalves and barnacles. Through feeding behaviors such as attacking the margin or lip of shells where defenses are weakest, Stramonita haemastoma insert its proboscid between the valves injecting proteolytic enzymes and a toxin that causes bivalves to gape.

Human use

The shell was one of two principal sources of Tyrian purple, a highly prized dye used in classical times for the clothing of royalty, as recorded by Aristotle and Pliny the Elder.

References

Further reading
 Bernard, P.A. (Ed.) (1984). Coquillages du Gabon [Shells of Gabon]. Pierre A. Bernard: Libreville, Gabon. 140, 75 plates
 Gofas, S.; Afonso, J.P.; Brandào, M. (Ed.). (S.a.). Conchas e Moluscos de Angola = Coquillages et Mollusques d'Angola. [Shells and molluscs of Angola]. Universidade Agostinho / Elf Aquitaine Angola: Angola. 140 pp
 Gofas, S.; Le Renard, J.; Bouchet, P. (2001). Mollusca, in: Costello, M.J. et al. (Ed.) (2001). European register of marine species: a check-list of the marine species in Europe and a bibliography of guides to their identification. Collection Patrimoines Naturels, 50: pp. 180–213
 Rolán E., 2005. Malacological Fauna From The Cape Verde Archipelago. Part 1, Polyplacophora and Gastropoda
 Rosenberg, G., F. Moretzsohn, and E. F. García. 2009. Gastropoda (Mollusca) of the Gulf of Mexico, Pp. 579–699 in Felder, D.L. and D.K. Camp (eds.), Gulf of Mexico–Origins, Waters, and Biota. Biodiversity. Texas A&M Press, College Station, Texas.
 Ramírez R., Tuya F. & Haroun R. J. (2009) "Spatial patterns in the population structure of the whelk Stramonita haemastoma (Linnaeus, 1766) (Gastropoda: Muricidae) in the Canarian Archipelago (eastern Atlantic)". Scientia Marina 73(3) 
 Claremont M., Williams S.T., Barraclough T.G. & Reid D.G. (2011) The geographic scale of speciation in a marine snail with high dispersal potential. Journal of Biogeography 38: 1016-1032.
 Claremont M., Vermeij G.J., Williams S.T. & Reid D.G. (2013) Global phylogeny and new classification of the Rapaninae (Gastropoda: Muricidae), dominant molluscan predators on tropical rocky seashores. Molecular Phylogenetics and Evolution 66: 91–102.
 Scheltema R. (1971). Larval dispersal as a means of genetic exchange between geographically separated populations of shallow-water benthic marine Gastropods. Biological Bulletin 140: 284-322
 Garrigues B. & Lamy D. (2019). Inventaire des Muricidae récoltés au cours de la campagne MADIBENTHOS du MNHN en Martinique (Antilles Françaises) et description de 12 nouvelles espèces des genres Dermomurex, Attilosa, Acanthotrophon, Favartia, Muricopsis et Pygmaepterys (Mollusca, Gastropoda). Xenophora Taxonomy. 23: 22-59.

External links
 
 Linnaeus, C. (1767). Systema naturae per regna tria naturae: secundum classes, ordines, genera, species, cum characteribus, differentiis, synonymis, locis. Ed. 12. 1., Regnum Animale. 1 & 2. Holmiae
 Dunker, W. (1857). Mollusca nova collectionis Cumingianae. Proceedings of the Zoological Society of London. 24: 354-358
  Calcara P. (1840). Monografie dei generi Clausilia e Bulimo coll'aggiunta di alcune nuove specie di conchiglie siciliane esistenti nella collezione della Sig. Teresa Gargotta in Salinas. Palermo, Muratori 54 p
 Reeve, L. A. (1846). Monograph of the genus Purpura. In: Conchologia iconica, or, illustrations of the shells of molluscous animals, Vol. 3. L. Reeve & Co., London. Pls. 1-13 and unpaginated text 
 Conrad, T. A. (1837). Description of new marine shells, from Upper California. Collected by Thomas Nuttall, Esq. Journal of the Academy of Natural Sciences, Philadelphia. 7: 227-268, pls 17-20.
 Locard, A. (1886). Prodrome de malacologie française. Catalogue général des mollusques vivants de France. Mollusques marins. Lyon: H. Georg & Paris: Baillière. x + 778 pp.
 Lamarck, J. B. P. A. de M. de. (1816). Tableau encyclopédique et méthodique des trois règnes de la nature, Mollusques et polypes divers. Part 23
 Philippi, R. A. (1844). Enumeratio molluscorum Siciliae cum viventium tum in tellure tertiaria fossilium, quae in itinere suo observavit. Vol. 2.. Halle 
 Bucquoy E., Dautzenberg P. & Dollfus G. (1882-1886). Les mollusques marins du Roussillon. Tome Ier. Gastropodes. Paris: Baillière & fils. 570 pp., 66 pls
 Kobelt, W. (1887-1908). Iconographie der schalentragenden europäischen Meeresconchylien. 1: 1-171 pl. 1-28
 Röding, P.F. (1798). Museum Boltenianum sive Catalogus cimeliorum e tribus regnis naturæ quæ olim collegerat Joa. Fried Bolten, M. D. p. d. per XL. annos proto physicus Hamburgensis. Pars secunda continens Conchylia sive Testacea univalvia, bivalvia & multivalvia. Trapp, Hamburg. viii, 199 pp.
 Perry, G. (1811). Conchology, or the natural history of shells: containing a new arrangement of the genera and species, illustrated by coloured engravings executed from the natural specimens, and including the latest discoveries. 4 pp., 61 plates. London
 Gmelin J.F. (1791). Vermes. In: Gmelin J.F. (Ed.) Caroli a Linnaei Systema Naturae per Regna Tria Naturae, Ed. 13. Tome 1(6). G.E. Beer, Lipsiae (Leipzig). pp. 3021-3910.

Stramonita
Molluscs of the Atlantic Ocean
Gastropods of Africa
Molluscs of Europe
Molluscs of South America
Molluscs of the Mediterranean Sea
Molluscs of the Canary Islands
Molluscs of Angola
Gastropods of Cape Verde
Gastropods described in 1767
Taxa named by Carl Linnaeus